Baptist is an unincorporated community in Tangipahoa Parish, Louisiana, United States. Baptist is located on U.S. Route 190, west of Hammond.

References

Unincorporated communities in Tangipahoa Parish, Louisiana
Unincorporated communities in Louisiana